The Canton of Albert is a canton situated in the department of the Somme and in the Hauts-de-France region of northern France.

Geography 
The canton is organised around the commune of Albert.

Composition
At the French canton reorganisation which came into effect in March 2015, the canton was expanded from 26 to 67 communes (4 of which were merged into the new communes Étinehem-Méricourt and Carnoy-Mametz):

Acheux-en-Amiénois
Albert
Arquèves
Auchonvillers
Authie
Authuille
Aveluy
Bayencourt
Bazentin
Beaucourt-sur-l'Ancre
Beaumont-Hamel
Bécordel-Bécourt
Bertrancourt
Bouzincourt
Bray-sur-Somme
Buire-sur-l'Ancre
Bus-lès-Artois
Cappy
Carnoy-Mametz
Chuignolles
Coigneux
Colincamps
Contalmaison
Courcelette
Courcelles-au-Bois
Curlu
Dernancourt
Éclusier-Vaux
Englebelmer
Étinehem-Méricourt
Forceville
Fricourt
Frise
Grandcourt
Harponville
Hédauville
Hérissart
Irles
Laviéville
Léalvillers
Louvencourt
Mailly-Maillet
Maricourt
Marieux
Méaulte
Mesnil-Martinsart
Millencourt
Miraumont
Montauban-de-Picardie
Morlancourt
La Neuville-lès-Bray
Ovillers-la-Boisselle
Pozières
Puchevillers
Pys
Raincheval
Saint-Léger-lès-Authie
Senlis-le-Sec
Suzanne
Thiepval 
Thièvres
Toutencourt
Varennes
Vauchelles-lès-Authie
Ville-sur-Ancre

Population

See also
 Arrondissements of the Somme department
 Cantons of the Somme department
 Communes of the Somme department

References

Albert